Harrow & Wealdstone is a London Underground and railway station on the Watford DC line and West Coast Main Line in Harrow and Wealdstone in the London Borough of Harrow. It is also the northern terminus of the Bakerloo line and the next station towards south is Kenton.

It is served by London Underground (Bakerloo line), London Overground, London Northwestern Railway, and Southern services. The station is located between The Bridge (which joins the southern end of High Street) and Sandridge Close, with entrances leading to both. It is one of the oldest stations in the London region in existence.

The Harrow and Wealdstone rail crash of 1952, which killed 112 people, occurred at the station. It remains Britain's worst peacetime rail disaster.

History

The station was opened by the London and Birmingham Railway (L&BR) as Harrow on 20 July 1837 in what was then rural Middlesex. The station buildings on the south west (Harrow) side of the station are the older part of the station, located beside what were the fast lines until the platforms were used for the later Euston to Watford DC line and the main line tracks were re-routed through the previous slow line platforms and new platforms (numbers 5 and 6) to the north east; a new, larger, station building was also erected on this Wealdstone side of the station in 1912. The station footbridge was originally constructed with a full-height central barrier with passengers using the "London" side and railway and postal staff using the "country" side to move goods and mail via lifts which were removed in the early 1970s, leaving two parcel elevators serving the DC line platforms for the remaining postal traffic.

On 18 December 1890, a short branch line known as the Stanmore branch line was opened by the London & North Western Railway (LNWR, successor to the L&BR). In 1932 an intermediate halt was constructed as Belmont to serve the developing residential areas locally. The train was known affectionately as the "Belmont Rattler".

By the end of the 19th century Wealdstone had developed in size and the station was given its current name on 1 May 1897 to reflect more accurately its location.

On 16 April 1917, Bakerloo line services were extended from Willesden Junction to Watford Junction running on the newly electrified local tracks (the "New Lines", which were originally steam-worked) and calling at Harrow & Wealdstone from that date.

On 15 September 1952, the passenger service to Stanmore – by then renamed Stanmore Village to avoid confusion with the Metropolitan Railway's (later Bakerloo, and now Jubilee) station opened in 1934 – was withdrawn. Freight traffic (particularly the storage of bananas) continued sporadically until 1964.

During the early 1960s, as part of the West Coast Main Line electrification, the bridge carrying the A409 road (The Bridge/Station Approach) over the railway was rebuilt easing the previous severe road gradients and offering higher clearance over the tracks to allow for overhead catenary cabling.

On 5 October 1964, all services on the branch line to Belmont were withdrawn as part of the cuts of the Beeching Axe. The permanent way north of Harrow and Wealdstone station was removed but the disused platform 7 on the eastern side of the station was left in place as a siding for a further few years until it too was removed.

On 24 September 1982, Bakerloo line services to Harrow & Wealdstone ended when services north of Stonebridge Park were ended. However the closure was short-lived, and the Bakerloo line to Harrow & Wealdstone was reinstated on 4 June 1984 with the station acting as the terminus.

In the 1990s major reconstruction of local roads made to by-pass High Street, Wealdstone sent a new road (Ellen Webb Drive) through what remained of the station goods yard and part of the forecourt of the eastern entrance (1917) to the station.

Accidents and incidents
In 1870, a mail train was in a rear-end collision with a freight train. Eight people were killed, including the cricketer James Rowley.
On 8 October 1952, the station witnessed Britain's worst train crash in peacetime when 112 people were killed and 340 were injured as a result of a Scottish express train colliding with the rear of a local train standing at platform 4. Seconds later a northbound express hauled by two locomotives collided with the wreckage causing further injury and demolished one span of the footbridge and the northern end of platforms 2 and 3. A memorial plaque was placed above the main entrance on the eastern side of the station to mark the 50th anniversary in 2002.

Facilities

The station has undergone several improvements in recent years: removal of the central barrier to allow use of the full width of the footbridge (which links both entrances and all platforms); new lifts for the use of disabled persons; newly painted and brightly-illuminated waiting rooms. When the line was resignalled with standard BR signalling in the 1980s, the two reversing sidings (used for turning Bakerloo line trains and occasionally DC line trains) located between the tracks of the DC line at the northern end side of the station were replaced by a single siding. This allowed the curve at the northern end of platform 2 to be eased using the space vacated by the removed siding. In practice, the remaining siding became unavailable for use by LO trains except when Bakerloo trains are not running as current (2018) service levels means that the siding is not sufficient for the reversing of Bakerloo trains, some trains have to reverse in platform 1 as well. Harrow and Wealdstone (together with Willesden Junction) is one of the two stations on the DC line which can be used for turning or stabling trains clear of the running lines during reduced or disrupted services although trains can be reversed using crossovers at other stations.

Ticket gatelines have been installed at both entrances in addition to the pre-existing booking offices

Trains on the Fast lines pass the station through platforms 3 and 4, usually without stopping to serve it; access to these platforms is now by staff-operated gates which are opened when necessary. Southern and London Northwestern Railway stopping services generally use platforms 5 and 6 on the Slow lines but all can use either pair of platforms when needed since the four Main Line platforms were lengthened to take 12-coach trains. Platform 2 on the Up DC line has unusually been maintained at a length of 182m rather than the usual DC line length of around 125m, long enough for an 8-coach train; on rare past occasions in recent years involving total closure of the Fast and Slow lines, main line trains have been diverted over the DC line between Watford Junction and Euston but without stopping at intermediate stations.

Services

Main line services
As of December 2015 the typical Monday–Saturday service is:
 1tph to East Croydon (Southern).

Local services (DC line)
Services are operated by National Rail London Overground and by non-National Rail services provided by London Underground on the Bakerloo line. Typical Monday–Saturday frequencies in November 2015

 4tph to London Euston (London Overground)
 6tph to Elephant & Castle (London Underground)
 4tph to Watford Junction (London Overground)

Future proposals

Crossrail
This would provide a direct service from the WCML to the Shenfield, Canary Wharf and Abbey Wood, release London Underground capacity at Euston, make better use of Crossrail's capacity west of Paddington, and improve access to Heathrow Airport from the north. Under this scheme, all Crossrail trains would continue west of Paddington, instead of some of them terminating there. They would serve Heathrow Airport (10 tph), stations to Maidenhead and Reading (6 tph), and stations to Milton Keynes Central (8 tph).

The extension would relieve some pressure from London Underground and London Euston station while also increasing connectivity. Conditions to the extension are that any extra services would not affect the planned service pattern for confirmed routes, as well as affordability.

Access and connections
The TfL Getting Around map shows this station as having disabled access (platform 1 does not involve the use of a lift when entering/leaving the Harrow entrance nor does platform 6 using the Wealdstone entrance).

The station is at the southern end of Wealdstone High Street; it is a short distance from Harrow Civic Centre and less than a mile from Harrow town centre. The station serves these areas as well as Belmont and Harrow Weald, both of which lack stations of their own, and parts of Headstone and Kenton. London Buses routes 140, 182, 186, 258, 340, 640, H9, H10, and night routes N18 and N140 serve the station.

References

External links

 London Transport Museum Photographic Archive
 
 
 
 
 Europe's history of rail disasters (BBC)
 Harrow and Wealdstone Disaster

Railway stations in the London Borough of Harrow
DfT Category C1 stations
Tube stations in the London Borough of Harrow
Former London and Birmingham Railway stations
Railway stations in Great Britain opened in 1837
Bakerloo line stations
Railway stations served by London Overground
Railway stations served by West Midlands Trains
Railway stations served by Govia Thameslink Railway
Grade II listed buildings in the London Borough of Harrow
Stations on the West Coast Main Line